Renan Zanelli Consilieri (born 18 May 1992) is a Brazilian professional footballer who currently plays as a central midfielder for Talavera. He also plays in the positions of attacking midfielder and left winger.

References

External links
 Voetbal International profile 
 

1992 births
Living people
Brazilian footballers
Association football midfielders
Grêmio Osasco Audax Esporte Clube players
Willem II (football club) players
TOP Oss players
Eredivisie players
Eerste Divisie players
Footballers from São Paulo